Norman or Norm Foster may refer to:

 Norman Foster, Baron Foster of Thames Bank (born 1935), English architect and designer
 Norman Foster (bass) (1925–2000), American operatic bass and actor
 Norman Foster (cricketer) (1878–1960), Australian cricketer
 Norman Foster (director) (1903–1976), American film director and actor
 Norm Foster (ice hockey) (born 1965), Canadian ice hockey goaltender
 Norman Foster (military officer), British Army officer and Chief of the Nigerian Army (GOC)
 Norm Foster (playwright) (born 1949), Canadian playwright
 Norm Foster (politician) (1921–2006), Australian politician
 Norman Foster (rugby league) (1907–1999), English rugby league footballer of the 1930s for England and Keighley

See also
 Norman Foster Ramsey Jr. (1915–2011), American physicist